Closed-loop manufacturing (abbreviated CLM) is a closed-loop process of manufacturing and measuring (checking) in the manufacturing machine. The pre-stage to this is inspection in manufacturing. The idea is to reduce costs and improve the quality and accuracy of the produced parts.

General procedure 
Closed-loop manufacturing can be done in different ways dependent on the manufacturing technique and on the accuracy requirements.
 Planning the sequence (iterations)
 Producing nearly the target value on the part
 Measuring the real value
 Calculating the residual (stop if residual is smaller than needed accuracy)
 Manufacturing the residual
 Repeat from Step 3

Suitable manufacturing techniques 
CLM is very suitable for electrical discharge machining. Milling or turning is also suitable for CLM.

Suitable measuring techniques 
In machining measurement techniques have to fulfill special needs. In particular optical techniques have the advantage that they do not touch the part. The following parts are practically used:
 Focus variation
 Tactile probes

Advantages / Disadvantages 
The advantages are:
 Reduce tool costs
 Improving accuracy
 Quality control is done in the machine directly
 Measuring can be more accurate because the part does not need to be unloaded
 Better deployment of personnel
 Integrated sensor eliminates clamping errors

The disadvantages are:
 Planning is needed
 If planning is not done, machine time is increased

External links 
 EU EMRP project on traceable in-process dimensional measurement

Manufacturing